Bigg Boss is an Indian television reality show of the Bigg Boss franchise which airs on Colors TV in India. It follows the format of the Dutch reality game show, Big Brother, which was first developed by Endemol in the Netherlands.  
Over 16 years, the show has rolled out sixteen seasons, one spin-off version & one OTT season.

Overview

Concept
Bigg Boss is a reality show based on the original Dutch Big Brother format developed by John de Mol. A number of contestants (known as "housemates") live in a purpose-built house and are isolated from the rest of the world. Each week, housemates nominate two of their peers for eviction, and the housemates who receive the most nominations would face a public vote. Of these, one would eventually leave, having been "evicted" from the House. However, there were exceptions to this process as dictated by Bigg Boss. In the final week, there were three/four/five housemates remaining, and the public voted for whom they wanted to win. The housemates in the Indian version are primarily celebrities with the exception of one who is a non-celebrity selected via auditions. However, Season 10-12 saw the addition of commoners on a great scale, with all 3 seasons featuring commoner finalists and Manveer winning Season 10. Housemates are overseen by a mysterious person known as 'Bigg Boss', whose only presence in the house is through his voice.

House
A Bigg Boss house is built for every season. The house was earlier located in the tourist place of Lonavla, Pune district of Maharashtra. However, the house for the fifth season was located at ND Studios in Karjat. The house from the thirteenth season onwards was located in Film City, Goregaon, Mumbai. The house is well-furnished and decorated and has many modern amenities, It consists of a kitchen, living area, 1-4 bedrooms and four toilet bathrooms. There is a storeroom, garden, pool, activity area and gym in the house. There is also a Confession Room, where the housemates may be called in by Bigg Boss for any kind of conversation, and for the nomination process.

The house has no TV connection, no telephones, no Internet connection, clocks, pen or paper.

Rules
While all the rules have never been told to the audience, the most prominent ones are clearly seen. The inmates are not permitted to talk in any other language than Hindi. They are not supposed to tamper with any of the electronic equipment or any other thing in the house. They cannot leave the house premises at any time except when permitted to. Physical violence is not allowed in the house. They cannot discuss the nomination process with anyone. They cannot sleep until the lights go off. They cannot talk to anyone outside the smoking area.

Sometimes, the housemates may be nominated for other reasons, such as nomination by a person who has achieved special privileges (via tasks or other things), for breaking rules or something else. If something is very serious, a contestant may be expelled from the house.

Airing
The main television coverage takes the form of a daily highlights programme and the weekly eviction show on Saturday/ Sunday known as Weekend Ka Vaar or Sunday/ Monday(Somvaar Ka Vaar)  or from sixteenth season onwards on Friday/Saturday (Shukravar Ka Vaar , Shanivar ka Vaar), that are aired on Colors TV while the first season was aired on Sony TV. Everyday episodes contain the main events of the previous day. Every Saturday's episode mainly focuses on the host explaining the performance of the housemates and special tasks. Sunday's episode consists of a fun segment with guests and eviction from the list of housemates nominated in that particular week but in Season 16, eviction happened on Saturdays instead of Sundays. From Season 14 onwards, Bigg Boss introduced a 24x7 Live Channel for Voot select subscribers in order to enjoy the direct and deeper engagement, connection, and indulgence in the comings and goings of the house and episodes would be telecasted 30 minutes before TV on Voot Select. In Season 16, a new segment, Bigg Bulletin With Shekhar Suman, aired on Sundays hosted by Shekhar Suman.

Series details

Bigg Boss OTT 

The series also had a digital version of the show called Bigg Boss OTT which was hosted by Karan Johar and broadcast by Voot for 24×7 coverage.

Housemate pattern

Controversies

References

External links
 

 
2006 Indian television series debuts
Colors TV original programming
Sony Entertainment Television original programming
2010s Indian television series
Indian television series based on non-Indian television series